Excel Esports (previously stylized as exceL Esports) is a British esports organisation with active rosters in League of Legends, Fortnite Battle Royale, and Valorant. Its main League of Legends division is one of ten teams competing in the League of Legends European Championship (LEC), the top level of professional League of Legends in Europe.

League of Legends

History

2018 

Riot Games announced on 20 November 2018 that Excel Esports would be one of ten franchise partners participating in the newly rebranded League of Legends European Championship (LEC). On 3 January 2019, Excel Esports announced that it would house a training facility in Twickenham Stadium.

2019 
For the 2019 LEC Spring Split, Excel signed top laner Ki "Expect" Dae-han, jungler Marc "Caedrel" Lamont, mid laner Fabian "Exile" Schubert, bot laner Jesper "Jeskla" Stromberg, and support Raymond "kaSing" Tsang. In addition to the team's main roster, five other players were also signed as substitutes who would alternate games with players on the main roster. However, the only substitutes who played on-stage in the LEC were mid laner Joran "Special" Scheffer and support Patryk "Mystiques" Piórkowski.

On 28 May 2019, Son "Mickey" Young-min officially joined Excel as starting mid laner. However, he did not play until the second week of the 2019 LEC Summer Split due to visa issues. On 20 June 2019, it was announced that Jeskla and Mystiques would replace Hjarnan and kaSing in the bot lane, and that the latter two would play for Excel UK.

2022

In November 2022, it was announced Excel had acquired the Stuttgart-based esports e-learning platform, Hitcap.

Current roster

Valorant

History 
Excel Esports announced on 8 March 2021 that they would be entering the competitive Valorant scene with their signing of Ignition Series Champion David "Davidp" Prins, who would be the team's captain.

Current roster

World of Warcraft

History 
In August 2018, Excel Esports acquired the WoW roster of Kjell's Angels, which consisted of Rory "Cirra" Singer, Rasmus "Divinefield" Andersen, Hakon 
"Dorullkjell" Walberg, Lari "Ashine" Strandberg and Kristoffer "Herudra" Jensen. The team participated in the Mythic Dungeon Invitational under the name Excel's Angels.

Former roster

References

External links 
 

2014 establishments in the United Kingdom
Esports teams based in the United Kingdom
Esports teams established in 2014
Hearthstone teams
League of Legends European Championship teams
World of Warcraft teams